Doug Hoppock is a former professional American football player who played offensive lineman for one seasons for the Kansas City Chiefs.

References

1960 births
American football offensive linemen
Kansas City Chiefs players
Chicago Blitz players
Kansas State Wildcats football players
Living people
National Football League replacement players